Knut Marius Røvde (born 26 June 1972) is a retired professional football player from Norway. During his career as a goalkeeper, he played at high levels in the Norway Eliteserien (Hønefoss BK, Stabæk Fotball, Hamarkameratene, and Lillestrøm SK), Scotlish Premier League (Ayr United F.C. and Motherwell F.C.) and English Championship (Wrexham A.F.C.)).

Most recently he has worked as Director, Deputy Technical Director and Goalkeeper Coach with various professional and national teams, including Major League Soccer clubs, the Vancouver Whitecaps and Minnesota United, and the national teams of Team Canada, Trinidad and Tobago FF.

Coaching 

Rovde holds a UEFA 'A' goalkeeper "pro-license" and a KNVB Johan Cruyff Masters of Sports Management.

In 2009, Rovde became director of goalkeepers for the Trinidad and Tobago Football Federation Men and Woman's program, and also served as Deputy Technical Director for TTFF Woman's program.
Rovde was a part of the U17 TTFF staff that was ranked No. 1 in CONCACAF, and No. 9 in FIFA World Rankings. His U17 goalkeeper was voted goalkeeper of the tournament in The U17 World Cup 2010 by FIFA. 
Rovde coached in four World Cup qualifiers for various Trinidad and Tobago teams.

Rovde worked closely alongside coaching legend Even Pellerud as Pellerud's assistant and advisor for Team Canada. 

In 2011, Rovde became the new head goalkeeper Coach for the MLS franchise Vancouver Whitecaps FC, working with veteran MLS goalkeepers, Joe Cannon and Jay Nolly, receiving praise for extending Cannon's career as he went on to receive most clean sheets in the MLS 2012 season, and most minutes without conceding goals in the history of the league. Goalkeeper Brad Knighton was added to the 2012 squad and achieved the MLS goalkeeper of the month award and claimed double figures in clean sheets over the course of the season. Rovde's unique goalkeeper coaching style was instrumental in helping the Whitecaps be the first Canadian team to reach the MLS Playoffs.

In 2013, Rovde recruited Danish goalkeeper David Ousted, who later achieved "MLS All-star" status twice. Ousted has said Rovde was the most influential goalkeeper coach in his career and a big part of his success in the MLS. Over three seasons Ousted achieved double figures in clean sheets and Whitecaps FC became the club in MLS with the most shutouts from 2012 to 2016. Ousted still holds the MLS record of minutes without conceding goals, surpassing Cannon.

During his time with the Whitecaps FC, Rovde managed and directed the goalkeeper pathways program for the Youth Academy, producing six Canadian national team goalkeepers. Rovde was responsible for discovering goalkeeper Marco Carducci, who achieved "Player of the year" status two years in a row from the Canadian Soccer Association. Carducci captained Canada in the U17 World Cup.

Canadian goalkeeper Simon Thomas, at one time released from Whitecaps FC, was reintroduced to the team by Rovde for two years as a training goalkeeper. Thomas earned a national men's first team game vs the United States Men's National Team in Houston in 2014 and is the only Canadian goalkeeper to have had a shutout vs USA in the last three decades. Simon Thomas went on to be a professional goalkeeper at the highest level in Norway and remains a regular on the Canadian men's national team.

In recent years, Rovde has focused on clubs in the Vancouver area, and held pro-series goalkeeper camps with the Whitecaps FC. These popular camps drew goalkeepers from across Canada. Directing the programs while mentoring and supporting young athletes, both male and female, to reach the best versions of themselves has been a focus and commitment from Rovde and many of his graduates have played on national teams and for professional clubs.

After the 2016 season, Rovde was offered a new challenge with the then-new MLS franchise, Minnesota United FC. Rovde worked closely with Minnesota's sports director, Manny Lagos, recruiting goalkeepers to the club, including Swedish national team goalkeeper John Alvbåge, experienced MLS goalkeeper Bobby Shuttleworth, USL goalkeeper of the year Patrick MacLain, and Alex Kapp. Shuttleworth finished off the season as the No. 1 goalkeeper and was voted MNUFC best overall player voted by the fans. Continuing his commitment to youth development, Rovde was heavily involved in the Minnesota United FC's Youth Academy, where he scouted, recruited and trained the first youth US national U15 goalkeeper, Fred Emmings, locally. Rovde's Pro Series goalkeeper camp grew in popularity in Minnesota within a short period, and two academy goalkeepers were recruited out of the participants in those camps.

Professional development 
Rovde spent 2018 in professional development, visiting top clubs in Norway, Denmark, Scotland, England, and the US and remains very involved in the local youth soccer community in Vancouver, Canada where he shares his experience with multiple youth clubs on a regular basis. 

Together with a small group of professional coaches from Houston, Seattle, Dallas and Colorado, Rovde was instrumental in founding an MLS goalkeeper coaches Union in 2017, and MLS and US Soccer's own goalkeeper Pro License program. Rovde suggested a minimum knowledge and experience requirement to become a MLS goalkeeping coach in order to raise standards and professionalism throughout the goalkeeper trade.

Sports management 
On 4 February 2020, after a short spell as Goalkeeping Program Technical Lead at youth club Richmond FC, in the city of Richmond, British Columbia, Canada, Rovde was elevated to the role of Executive Director of the club.

Pop culture 
In the video game FIFA 05, Rovde received a player score of 67, with a potential score of 77.

References

1972 births
Living people
Norwegian footballers
Stabæk Fotball players
Hønefoss BK players
Wrexham A.F.C. players
Ayr United F.C. players
Lillestrøm SK players
Hamarkameratene players
Drøbak-Frogn IL players
Vancouver Whitecaps FC non-playing staff
Minnesota United FC non-playing staff
Association football goalkeepers
English Football League players
Scottish Football League players
Norwegian expatriate footballers
Expatriate footballers in Scotland
Expatriate footballers in Wales
Pacific FC non-playing staff